Laakajärvi is medium-sized lake in the Vuoksi main catchment area. It is located in Sonkajärvi, Sotkamo and Kajaani municipalities, in the regions of Northern Savonia and Kainuu in Finland. The lake is just over 20 km long and relatively narrow. It is the biggest lake in Sonkajärvi municipality.

The lake is situated only a few kilometers from nickel mines of the Talvivaara Mining Company. The nature protection movements are worried that the mining can damage the lake.

See also
List of lakes in Finland

References

Lakes of Sotkamo
Lakes of Sonkajärvi